Vera Fischer may refer to:
Vera Fischer (actress) (born 1951), Brazilian actress
Vera Fischer (mathematician), Austrian mathematician
Vera Fischer (sculptor) (1925–2009), Croatian Jewish sculptor